Mary Alice Walton (1865–1954) was an American classicist and archaeologist and Professor Emerita of Latin at Wellesley College. She was "prominent among the first generation of American women who combined a close knowledge of the ancient sites with teaching in a women's college".

Career
Walton graduated from Smith College in 1887, and gained her PhD in 1892, from Cornell University, with a thesis on the cult of Asclepius. Her thesis was reissued in 1979, after her death as "Asclepios: the Cult of the Greek God of Medicine".

Following her PhD Walton was a Fellow of the American School of Classical Studies at Athens from 1892 to 1894 and 1895–96, returning again in 1910–11. She also served as a Fellow in the American Academy in Rome in 1903–04 and 1922–23. She taught archaeology and classics primarily in schools and colleges for women. She worked in Worcester, Massachusetts in 1888–1890 before moving to New York to work in Sach's Schools for Girls (latterly Dwight School). In 1896 she returned to Massachusetts to Wellesley College where she remained for the rest of her career teaching classics, ancient art, Latin, and archaeology. In 1902 she was made Associate Professor of Latin and Archaeology, gaining her full Professorship in Latin in 1915. Walton was also the Chair of the Latin department at Wellesley from 1916 to 1917.

Walton was one of the early members of the Classical Association of New England (CANE) and served as its president from 1914 to 1915.

Select publications
Walton, A. 1900. "Some Transformations of Antiquity," The Wellesley Magazine 8, 159–65.
Walton, A. 1904. "'Calynthus' or Calamis", American Journal of Archaeology 8, 460–2.
Walton, A. 1906. "The Classics as a Means of Training in English", Bulletin of the Classical Association of New England 1, 29–31.
Walton, A. 1907. "An Unpublished Amphora and an Eye Cylix signed by Amasis in the Boston Museum", American Journal of Archaeology 11, 150–9.
Walton, A. 1916. "Painted Marbles from Thessaly", Art and Archaeology 4, 47–53.
Walton, A. 1924. "The Date of the Arch of Constantine", Memoirs of the American Academy at Rome 4, 169–180.

References

American archaeologists
1865 births
1954 deaths
Women classical scholars
Cornell University alumni
Smith College alumni
People from Lawrence, Massachusetts
American women archaeologists
Wellesley College faculty
American women academics